The following lists the events of the 1910 Philadelphia Phillies season.

Spring training 
The Phillies trained in March 1910 at the Southern Pines Country Club in Southern Pines, North Carolina. 

Phillies owner Horace Fogel considered the purchase of ten acres in Southern Pines in March 1910 to build a permanent spring training home for the Phillies to include a playing field and building to accommodate the full team and traveling party.

The Phillies unconditionally released Kid Gleason on April 12, 1910, prior to Opening Day. At the time, the Philadelphia Inquirer called Gleason "one of the most popular players who ever donned a Philadelphia uniform." Gleason would continue with the Phillies as a coach.

Regular season

Season standings

Record vs. opponents

Roster

Player stats

Batting

Starters by position 
Note: Pos = Position; G = Games played; AB = At bats; H = Hits; Avg. = Batting average; HR = Home runs; RBI = Runs batted in

Other batters 
Note: G = Games played; AB = At bats; H = Hits; Avg. = Batting average; HR = Home runs; RBI = Runs batted in

Pitching

Starting pitchers 
Note: G = Games pitched; IP = Innings pitched; W = Wins; L = Losses; ERA = Earned run average; SO = Strikeouts

Other pitchers 
Note: G = Games pitched; IP = Innings pitched; W = Wins; L = Losses; ERA = Earned run average; SO = Strikeouts

Relief pitchers 
Note: G = Games pitched; W = Wins; L = Losses; SV = Saves; ERA = Earned run average; SO = Strikeouts

References 

1910 Philadelphia Phillies season at Baseball Reference

Philadelphia Phillies seasons
Philadelphia Phillies season
Philly